USS Tullibee has been the name of more than one United States Navy ship, and may refer to:

, a submarine commissioned in 1943 and sunk in 1944
, a submarine in commission from 1960 to 1988

United States Navy ship names